Joseph McMullen Dargaville (1837 – 27 October 1896) was a 19th-century Member of Parliament from Auckland, New Zealand.

Early life
Joseph McMullen Dargaville was born in Cork, Ireland, the son of Anderson Dargaville, a physician, and his wife, Eliza McMullen. He was descended from Huguenots, who had fled to Ireland to escape persecution. He was baptised on 27 June 1837 and presumed to have been born earlier that same year. He attended Fermoy College.

Business career
Dargaville emigrated with his brothers to Victoria. In early 1859 he relocated again, this time to Sydney, where he obtained a clerking job with the Union Bank of Australia at a salary of £100 per annum. From 1860 to 1866 he worked in several branches of the bank in New South Wales, Tasmania and Victoria.

Marriage
On 20 April 1865 at Portland, Victoria, he wed Anne Must, daughter of Thomas and Anne Must; the couple had at least six children. His wife was born on 1 May 1845 in Sydney, they had two sons and five daughters.

Political career

Dargaville would represent Auckland East on the Auckland Provincial Council from 1873 to 1876.

In the  election, he stood in the  electorate against three others (Robert Houston, James Trounsen, and John Lundon) and came last.

He contested the Bay of Islands electorate again in the  against two others (Houston and Trownson) and again came last.

He founded the Northland town of Dargaville, named for him. He was a prominent businessman and timber merchant there.

He was a member of the Orange Order.

Death
Dargaville was on a return visit from England when he died aboard the Mariposa on 27 October 1896, and was buried at sea.

References

1837 births
1896 deaths
Members of the New Zealand House of Representatives
Members of the Auckland Provincial Council
Irish emigrants to New Zealand (before 1923)
Politicians from County Cork
New Zealand bankers
New Zealand businesspeople
Dargaville
Date of birth unknown
Unsuccessful candidates in the 1887 New Zealand general election
Unsuccessful candidates in the 1890 New Zealand general election
Unsuccessful candidates in the 1893 New Zealand general election
New Zealand MPs for Auckland electorates
Irish emigrants to colonial Australia
19th-century New Zealand politicians
Auckland City Councillors